Denys Yanchuk (born 14 August 1988) is a Ukrainian former footballer who played as a midfielder.

Playing career 
Yanchuk began his career in 2006 with Iskra-Skirts in the Ukrainian Football Amateur League. In 2007, he signed with FC Podillya Khmelnytskyi of the Ukrainian Second League, where he featured in a total of 24 matches. In 2008, he went overseas to Canada to play with FC Ukraine United in the Ontario Soccer League. During his tenure with Ukraine United he won the OSL Central Regional Division title, George Finnie Cup, and the Great Lakes Cup.

In 2016, he played an instrumental role along with Vladimir Koval, and Andrei Malychenkov in bringing Ukraine United into the Canadian Soccer League. In his debut season in the CSL he served as club president while remaining an active player. The following season he signed with FC Vorkuta, and appeared in four matches and scored one goal in the Second Division.

Managerial career 
In 2018, he served as the general manager for Vorkuta, and assistant coach for Samad Kadirov. He assisted in securing the club's first CSL Championship against Scarborough SC. In 2020, he was assigned head coach responsibilities for Vorkuta. He managed to lead Vorkuta to their second championship title after defeating Scarborough SC. In 2021, he became an agent for UEFA.

References 

1988 births
Living people
Ukrainian footballers
FC Podillya Khmelnytskyi players
FC Ukraine United players
FC Continentals players
Canadian Soccer League (1998–present) players
Association football midfielders
Ukrainian Second League players
Canadian Soccer League (1998–present) managers
Sportspeople from Khmelnytskyi, Ukraine